99 Monkeys is a studio album by American singer-songwriter Bob Neuwirth. It was released in 1991 by Gold Castle Records. It was produced by Steven Soles and it features guests Katy Moffatt, Billy Swan and Peter Case. It was his first album since 1988's Back to the Front.

Track listing
"Great Spirit" (Bob Neuwirth, Robby Romero) – 3:30
"Biggest Bordertown" (Neuwirth, Tom Russell) – 4:37
"The First Time" (Neuwirth) – 4:17
"Good Intentions" (Neuwirth, Lyle Lovett) – 5:39
"Biding Her Time" (Neuwirth) – 4:00
"Life Is for the Living" (Neuwirth) – 4:43
"Dazzled by Diamonds" (Neuwirth) – 4:06
"Ancient Questions (War & Peace)" (Neuwirth) – 7:52
"Winter in Berlin" (Neuwirth) – 3:55
"Cloudy Day" (Neuwirth) – 3:32 (bonus)
"Busted Bottle" (Neuwirth, Kris Kristofferson) – 3:14 (bonus)

Personnel
Bob Neuwirth - vocals, guitar, harmonica, cover painting
David Kemper - percussion
with:
Billy Swan, Katy Moffatt, David Mansfield - guitar, vocals
Steve Young, Steven Soles, Peter Case - guitar
Jack Sherman - bass, guitar
Lisa Maxwell - tenor saxophone
John Bilezikjian - oud

References

Bob Neuwirth albums
1991 albums